Kinor David (lit: "David's Harp") is an annual Israeli cultural award.

History
The Israeli newspaper Yedioth Ahronoth presented the Kinor David Award from 1964 to 1986 for outstanding achievement in entertainment, theatre, film, music, and broadcasting. 

Awards were presented for the following categories:
 Play/Show of the Year
 Actor and Actress of the Year (theater/stage)
 Actor and Actress of the Year (film)
 Director of the Year
 Best Film of the Year
 Singer (female and male) of the Year
 Band of the Year
 Radio Program of the Year
 TV Program of the Year
 Composer of the Year
 Lyricist of the Year
 Best Dance/Ballet Show of the Year
 Dancer (male and female) of the Year

In 1994, Yedioth Aharonoth established a similar award, "Golden Screen".

Recipients 

Gila Almagor
Yardena Arazi
Shlomo Artzi
Chocolate, Menta, Mastik
Ran Eliran
Hakol Over Habibi
Nurit Hirsh
Ilanit
Oded Kotler
Shuli Natan
Daniel Pe'er
Orna Porat
Dov Seltzer
Naomi Shemer
Chaim Topol
Haim Yavin
Zion Zadok
Uri Zohar
Ze'eva Cohen
Dudu Topaz

Venue
Heichal HaTarbut

References

1964 establishments in Israel
1986 disestablishments in Israel
Israeli awards
Recurring events established in 1964
Recurring events disestablished in 1986
Yedioth Ahronoth